SEE TV  is a Ugandan television network based in the Naguru neighborhood of Kampala.

Overview 
The channel was launched in July 2021. It started  broadcasting  on 1 August 2021
The  station is known for its focus on  News,  politics,  also has a series of business, edu-entertainment, Lifestyle,  sports, and entertainment shows.

Notable programs 
Pm Edition
Enjuba Egoloobye
Brunch Request Live
411 Paparazzi
Sunrise at SEE
The Big Debate
The Grill
Impact Show
Seetuation Ku Ground
The Booth

Presenters
Adams Mayambala 
Melissa Mboha
Bux Munira
Ramlah Katumba
Kalaki Brian
Simon Chris Makanga
Amelia Martha Nakitimbo
Gabriel Iguma
Auma Shivan Shiela
Apollo Sarah 
Aggie Uwase
Starborn Timkash
Shamim Mayanja
Aaliyah Nanfuka aka Kabejja
Privah Eliberz

References

External links
  Official site 

Television stations in Uganda
English-language television stations
Television channels and stations established in 2021